Robert James Kelly (born November 25, 1950) is a Canadian former professional ice hockey left winger who played 12 seasons in the National Hockey League (NHL) for the Philadelphia Flyers and Washington Capitals.

Career
Selected in 1970 by the Philadelphia Flyers, Kelly was an aggressive left-winger who became a member of the famous "Broad Street Bullies" and helped guide the Flyers to their two consecutive Stanley Cup championships in 1974 and 1975. Along with teammate Dave Schultz, Kelly was one of the team's top enforcers.

Kelly scored the 1975 Cup-winning goal 11 seconds into the third period of game six. In a tremendous individual effort, he stole the puck behind the Sabres' net and was able to shoot from the opposite side of the ice where the puck bounced off the post then off the goalies back and in, it is a famous goal in hockey history. Roger Crozier.

Kelly played with the Flyers until the 1979–80 NHL season when he was traded to the Washington Capitals. He had a career year offensively in his first season with the Capitals, scoring 26 goals and 36 assists for a total of 62 points. After playing on a checking line with the Flyers, he was promoted to the Capitals' top line, alongside Jean Pronovost and Mike Gartner and proved to be an excellent complement to the two highly-skilled players, using his size to create space for them. He also played regularly on the power play for the only time of his career, scoring 8 of his career 14 power play goals that season. However, after playing 16 games during the first two months of the 1981–82 season, the Capitals and Kelly mutually agreed to terminate his contract and Kelly retired.

He is now the Flyers' ambassador of hockey, visiting schools and teaching kids about the importance of teamwork. He also can be seen on the concourse of the Flyers' arena, the Wells Fargo Center, interacting with fans, and presenting awards to military guests during Flyers' home games.

Personal life
Kelly was known by several similar nicknames: "Hound Dog", "the Hound", "Mad Dog", "Muttley" or "Mutt", "Machine Gun Kelly", "Grass Fairy" and "Scourge of the Red Army".

Career statistics

References

External links
 
Profile at hockeydraftcentral.com

1950 births
Canadian ice hockey left wingers
Sportspeople from Oakville, Ontario
Living people
Oshawa Generals players
Philadelphia Flyers draft picks
Philadelphia Flyers players
Stanley Cup champions
Washington Capitals players
Ice hockey people from Ontario